Hugo Mayer Orgelbau is a German organ builder in Heusweiler, Saarland, building pipe organs in the third generation. It was founded in 1952 by Hugo Mayer (1912–1980) in Brebach and moved to Heusweiler in 1957. His son Gerd Mayer took over in 1974. His son Stephan has been leader of new instruments (Neubauabteilung) from 1996.

Works

References

External links 
 

German pipe organ builders
1952 establishments in Germany
Musical instrument manufacturing companies of Germany
Companies based in Saarland